James Dewey Watson (born April 6, 1928) is an American molecular biologist, geneticist, and zoologist. In 1953, he co-authored with Francis Crick the academic paper proposing the double helix structure of the DNA molecule. Watson, Crick and Maurice Wilkins were awarded the 1962 Nobel Prize in Physiology or Medicine "for their discoveries concerning the molecular structure of nucleic acids and its significance for information transfer in living material". In subsequent years, it has been recognized that Watson and his colleagues did not properly attribute colleague Rosalind Franklin for her contributions to the discovery of the double helix structure.

Watson earned degrees at the University of Chicago (BS, 1947) and Indiana University (PhD, 1950). Following a post-doctoral year at the University of Copenhagen with Herman Kalckar and Ole Maaløe, Watson worked at the University of Cambridge's Cavendish Laboratory in England, where he first met his future collaborator Francis Crick. From 1956 to 1976, Watson was on the faculty of the Harvard University Biology Department, promoting research in molecular biology.

From 1968, Watson served as director of Cold Spring Harbor Laboratory (CSHL), greatly expanding its level of funding and research. At CSHL, he shifted his research emphasis to the study of cancer, along with making it a world-leading research center in molecular biology. In 1994, he started as president and served for 10 years. He was then appointed chancellor, serving until he resigned in 2007 after making comments claiming that there is a genetic link between intelligence and race. In 2019, following the broadcast of a documentary in which Watson reiterated these views on race and genetics, CSHL revoked his honorary titles and severed all ties with him.

Watson has written many science books, including the textbook Molecular Biology of the Gene (1965) and his bestselling book The Double Helix (1968). Between 1988 and 1992, Watson was associated with the National Institutes of Health, helping to establish the Human Genome Project, which completed the task of mapping the human genome in 2003.

Early life and education 
Watson was born in Chicago on April 6, 1928, as the only son of Jean (née Mitchell) and James D. Watson, a businessman descended mostly from colonial English immigrants to America. His mother's father, Lauchlin Mitchell, a tailor, was from Glasgow, Scotland, and her mother, Lizzie Gleason, was the child of parents from County Tipperary, Ireland. Raised Catholic, he later described himself as "an escapee from the Catholic religion". Watson said, "The luckiest thing that ever happened to me was that my father didn't believe in God."

Watson grew up on the south side of Chicago and attended public schools, including Horace Mann Grammar School and South Shore High School. He was fascinated with bird watching, a hobby shared with his father, so he considered majoring in ornithology. Watson appeared on Quiz Kids, a popular radio show that challenged bright youngsters to answer questions. Thanks to the liberal policy of university president Robert Hutchins, he enrolled at the University of Chicago, where he was awarded a tuition scholarship, at the age of 15. Among his professors was Louis Leon Thurstone from whom Watson learned about factor analysis, which he would later reference on his controversial views on race.

After reading Erwin Schrödinger's book, What Is Life? in 1946, Watson changed his professional ambitions from the study of ornithology to genetics. Watson earned his BS degree in Zoology from the University of Chicago in 1947. In his autobiography, Avoid Boring People, Watson described the University of Chicago as an "idyllic academic institution where he was instilled with the capacity for critical thought and an ethical compulsion not to suffer fools who impeded his search for truth", in contrast to his description of later experiences. In 1947 Watson left the University of Chicago to become a graduate student at Indiana University, attracted by the presence at Bloomington of the 1946 Nobel Prize winner Hermann Joseph Muller, who in crucial papers published in 1922, 1929, and in the 1930s had laid out all the basic properties of the heredity molecule that Schrödinger presented in his 1944 book. He received his PhD degree from Indiana University in 1950; Salvador Luria was his doctoral advisor.

Career and research

Luria, Delbrück, and the Phage Group
Originally, Watson was drawn into molecular biology by the work of Salvador Luria. Luria eventually shared the 1969 Nobel Prize in Physiology or Medicine for his work on the Luria–Delbrück experiment, which concerned the nature of genetic mutations. He was part of a distributed group of researchers who were making use of the viruses that infect bacteria, called bacteriophages. He and Max Delbrück were among the leaders of this new "Phage Group", an important movement of geneticists from experimental systems such as Drosophila towards microbial genetics. Early in 1948, Watson began his PhD research in Luria's laboratory at Indiana University. That spring, he met Delbrück first in Luria's apartment and again that summer during Watson's first trip to the Cold Spring Harbor Laboratory (CSHL).

The Phage Group was the intellectual medium where Watson became a working scientist. Importantly, the members of the Phage Group sensed that they were on the path to discovering the physical nature of the gene. In 1949, Watson took a course with Felix Haurowitz that included the conventional view of that time: that genes were proteins and able to replicate themselves. The other major molecular component of chromosomes, DNA, was widely considered to be a "stupid tetranucleotide", serving only a structural role to support the proteins. Even at this early time, Watson, under the influence of the Phage Group, was aware of the Avery–MacLeod–McCarty experiment, which suggested that DNA was the genetic molecule. Watson's research project involved using X-rays to inactivate bacterial viruses.

Watson then went to Copenhagen University in September 1950 for a year of postdoctoral research, first heading to the laboratory of biochemist Herman Kalckar. Kalckar was interested in the enzymatic synthesis of nucleic acids, and he wanted to use phages as an experimental system. Watson wanted to explore the structure of DNA, and his interests did not coincide with Kalckar's. After working part of the year with Kalckar, Watson spent the remainder of his time in Copenhagen conducting experiments with microbial physiologist Ole Maaløe, then a member of the Phage Group.

The experiments, which Watson had learned of during the previous summer's Cold Spring Harbor phage conference, included the use of radioactive phosphate as a tracer to determine which molecular components of phage particles actually infect the target bacteria during viral infection. The intention was to determine whether protein or DNA was the genetic material, but upon consultation with Max Delbrück, they determined that their results were inconclusive and could not specifically identify the newly labeled molecules as DNA. Watson never developed a constructive interaction with Kalckar, but he did accompany Kalckar to a meeting in Italy, where Watson saw Maurice Wilkins talk about X-ray diffraction data for DNA. Watson was now certain that DNA had a definite molecular structure that could be elucidated.

In 1951, the chemist Linus Pauling in California published his model of the amino acid alpha helix, a result that grew out of Pauling's efforts in X-ray crystallography and molecular model building. After obtaining some results from his phage and other experimental research conducted at Indiana University, Statens Serum Institut (Denmark), CSHL, and the California Institute of Technology, Watson now had the desire to learn to perform X-ray diffraction experiments so he could work to determine the structure of DNA. That summer, Luria met John Kendrew, and he arranged for a new postdoctoral research project for Watson in England. In 1951 Watson visited the Stazione Zoologica 'Anton Dohrn' in Naples.

Identifying the double helix

In mid-March 1953, Watson and Crick deduced the double helix structure of DNA. Crucial to their discovery were the experimental data collected at King's College London—mainly by Rosalind Franklin for which they did not provide proper attribution. Sir Lawrence Bragg, the director of the Cavendish Laboratory (where Watson and Crick worked), made the original announcement of the discovery at a Solvay conference on proteins in Belgium on April 8, 1953; it went unreported by the press. Watson and Crick submitted a paper entitled "Molecular Structure of Nucleic Acids: A Structure for Deoxyribose Nucleic Acid" to the scientific journal Nature, which was published on April 25, 1953. Bragg gave a talk at the Guy's Hospital Medical School in London on Thursday, May 14, 1953, which resulted in a May 15, 1953, article by Ritchie Calder in the London newspaper News Chronicle, entitled "Why You Are You. Nearer Secret of Life".

Sydney Brenner, Jack Dunitz, Dorothy Hodgkin, Leslie Orgel, and Beryl M. Oughton were some of the first people in April 1953 to see the model of the structure of DNA, constructed by Crick and Watson; at the time, they were working at Oxford University's Chemistry Department. All were impressed by the new DNA model, especially Brenner, who subsequently worked with Crick at Cambridge in the Cavendish Laboratory and the new Laboratory of Molecular Biology. According to the late Beryl Oughton, later Rimmer, they all travelled together in two cars once Dorothy Hodgkin announced to them that they were off to Cambridge to see the model of the structure of DNA.

The Cambridge University student newspaper Varsity also ran its own short article on the discovery on Saturday, May 30, 1953. Watson subsequently presented a paper on the double-helical structure of DNA at the 18th Cold Spring Harbor Symposium on Viruses in early June 1953, six weeks after the publication of the Watson and Crick paper in Nature. Many at the meeting had not yet heard of the discovery. The 1953 Cold Spring Harbor Symposium was the first opportunity for many to see the model of the DNA double helix.

Watson, Crick, and Wilkins were awarded the Nobel Prize in Physiology or Medicine in 1962 for their research on the structure of nucleic acids. Rosalind Franklin had died in 1958 and was therefore ineligible for nomination.

The publication of the double helix structure of DNA has been described as a turning point in science; understanding of life was fundamentally changed and the modern era of biology began.

Interactions with Rosalind Franklin and Raymond Gosling
Watson and Crick's use of DNA X-ray diffraction data collected by Rosalind Franklin and her student Raymond Gosling was unauthorized. Franklin's high-quality X-ray diffraction patterns of DNA were privileged unpublished information taken without permission from a scientist working on the same subject in another laboratory. Watson and Crick used some of Franklin's unpublished data—without her consent—in their construction of the double helix model of DNA. Franklin's results provided estimates of the water content of DNA crystals and these results were consistent with the two sugar-phosphate backbones being on the outside of the molecule. Franklin told Crick and Watson that the backbones had to be on the outside; before then, Linus Pauling and Watson and Crick had erroneous models with the chains inside and the bases pointing outwards. Her identification of the space group for DNA crystals revealed to Crick that the two DNA strands were antiparallel.

The X-ray diffraction images collected by Gosling and Franklin provided the best evidence for the helical nature of DNA. Watson and Crick had three sources for Franklin's unpublished data: 
Her 1951 seminar, attended by Watson;
Discussions with Wilkins, who worked in the same laboratory with Franklin;
A research progress report that was intended to promote coordination of Medical Research Council-supported laboratories. Watson, Crick, Wilkins and Franklin all worked in MRC laboratories.

In recent years, Watson has garnered controversy in the popular and scientific press for his "misogynistic treatment" of Franklin and his failure to properly attribute her work on DNA. In The Double Helix, Watson later admitted that "Rosy, of course, did not directly give us her data. For that matter, no one at King's realized they were in our hands." According to one critic, Watson's portrayal of Franklin in The Double Helix was negative, giving the impression that she was Wilkins' assistant and was unable to interpret her own DNA data. Watson's accusation was indefensible since Franklin told Crick and Watson that the helix backbones had to be on the outside. From a 2003 piece in Nature:

A review of the correspondence from Franklin to Watson, in the archives at CSHL, revealed that the two scientists later exchanged constructive scientific correspondence. Franklin consulted with Watson on her tobacco mosaic virus RNA research. Franklin's letters were framed with the normal and unremarkable forms of address, beginning with "Dear Jim", and concluding with "Best Wishes, Yours, Rosalind". Each of the scientists published their own unique contributions to the discovery of the structure of DNA in separate articles, and all of the contributors published their findings in the same volume of Nature. These classic molecular biology papers are identified as: Watson J. D. and Crick F. H. C. "A Structure for Deoxyribose Nucleic Acid". Nature 171, 737–738 (1953); Wilkins M. H. F., Stokes A. R. & Wilson H. R. "Molecular Structure of Deoxypentose Nucleic Acids". Nature 171, 738–740 (1953); Franklin R. and Gosling R. G. "Molecular Configuration in Sodium Thymonucleate". Nature 171, 740–741 (1953).

Harvard University
In 1956, Watson accepted a position in the Biology department at Harvard University. His work at Harvard focused on RNA and its role in the transfer of genetic information.

Watson championed a switch in focus for the school from classical biology to molecular biology, stating that disciplines such as ecology, developmental biology, taxonomy, physiology, etc. had stagnated and could progress only once the underlying disciplines of molecular biology and biochemistry had elucidated their underpinnings, going so far as to discourage their study by students.

Watson continued to be a member of the Harvard faculty until 1976, even though he took over the directorship of Cold Spring Harbor Laboratory in 1968.

During his tenure at Harvard, Watson participated in a protest against the Vietnam War, leading a group of 12 biologists and biochemists calling for "the immediate withdrawal of U.S. forces from Vietnam". In 1975, on the thirtieth anniversary of the bombing of Hiroshima, Watson was one of over 2000 scientists and engineers who spoke out against nuclear proliferation to President Gerald Ford, arguing that there was no proven method for the safe disposal of radioactive waste, and that nuclear plants were a security threat due to the possibility of terrorist theft of plutonium.

Watson's first textbook, The Molecular Biology of the Gene, used the concept of heads—brief declarative subheadings. His next textbook was Molecular Biology of the Cell, in which he coordinated the work of a group of scientist-writers. His third was Recombinant DNA, which described the ways in which genetic engineering has brought new information about how organisms function.

Publishing The Double Helix

In 1968, Watson wrote The Double Helix, listed by the Board of the Modern Library as number seven in their list of 100 Best Nonfiction books. The book details the story of the discovery of the structure of DNA, as well as the personalities, conflicts and controversy surrounding their work, and includes many of his private emotional impressions at the time. Watson's original title was to have been "Honest Jim". Controversy surrounded the publication of the book. Watson's book was originally to be published by the Harvard University Press, but Francis Crick and Maurice Wilkins, among others, objected. Watson's home university dropped the project and the book was commercially published. In an interview with Anne Sayre for her book, Rosalind Franklin and DNA (published in 1975 and reissued in 2000), Francis Crick said that he regarded Watson's book as a "contemptible pack of damned nonsense".

Cold Spring Harbor Laboratory

In 1968, Watson became the Director of the Cold Spring Harbor Laboratory (CSHL). Between 1970 and 1972, the Watsons' two sons were born, and by 1974, the young family made Cold Spring Harbor their permanent residence. Watson served as the laboratory's director and president for about 35 years, and later he assumed the role of chancellor and then Chancellor Emeritus.

In his roles as director, president, and chancellor, Watson led CSHL to articulate its present-day mission, "dedication to exploring molecular biology and genetics in order to advance the understanding and ability to diagnose and treat cancers, neurological diseases, and other causes of human suffering." CSHL substantially expanded both its research and its science educational programs under Watson's direction. He is credited with "transforming a small facility into one of the world's great education and research institutions. Initiating a program to study the cause of human cancer, scientists under his direction have made major contributions to understanding the genetic basis of cancer." In a retrospective summary of Watson's accomplishments there, Bruce Stillman, the laboratory's president, said, "Jim Watson created a research environment that is unparalleled in the world of science."

In 2007, Watson said, "I turned against the left wing because they don't like genetics, because genetics implies that sometimes in life we fail because we have bad genes. They want all failure in life to be due to the evil system."

Human Genome Project

In 1990, Watson was appointed as the Head of the Human Genome Project at the National Institutes of Health, a position he held until April 10, 1992. Watson left the Genome Project after conflicts with the new NIH Director, Bernadine Healy. Watson was opposed to Healy's attempts to acquire patents on gene sequences, and any ownership of the "laws of nature". Two years before stepping down from the Genome Project, he had stated his own opinion on this long and ongoing controversy which he saw as an illogical barrier to research; he said, "The nations of the world must see that the human genome belongs to the world's people, as opposed to its nations." He left within weeks of the 1992 announcement that the NIH would be applying for patents on brain-specific cDNAs. (The issue of the patentability of genes has since been resolved in the US by the US Supreme Court; see Association for Molecular Pathology v. U.S. Patent and Trademark Office.)

In 1994, Watson became President of CSHL. Francis Collins took over the role as Director of the Human Genome Project.

Watson was quoted in The Sunday Telegraph in 1997 as stating: "If you could find the gene which determines sexuality and a woman decides she doesn't want a homosexual child, well, let her." The biologist Richard Dawkins wrote a letter to The Independent claiming that Watson's position was misrepresented by The Sunday Telegraph article, and that Watson would equally consider the possibility of having a heterosexual child to be just as valid as any other reason for abortion, to emphasise that Watson is in favor of allowing choice.

On the issue of obesity, Watson was quoted in 2000, saying: "Whenever you interview fat people, you feel bad, because you know you're not going to hire them."

Watson has repeatedly supported genetic screening and genetic engineering in public lectures and interviews, arguing that stupidity is a disease and the "really stupid" bottom 10% of people should be cured. He has also suggested that beauty could be genetically engineered, saying in 2003, "People say it would be terrible if we made all girls pretty. I think it would be great."

In 2007, James Watson became the second person to publish his fully sequenced genome online, after it was presented to him on May 31, 2007, by 454 Life Sciences Corporation in collaboration with scientists at the Human Genome Sequencing Center, Baylor College of Medicine. Watson was quoted as saying, "I am putting my genome sequence on line to encourage the development of an era of personalized medicine, in which information contained in our genomes can be used to identify and prevent disease and to create individualized medical therapies".

Later life
In 2014, Watson published a paper in The Lancet suggesting that biological oxidants may have a different role than is thought in diseases including diabetes, dementia, heart disease and cancer. For example, type 2 diabetes is usually thought to be caused by oxidation in the body that causes inflammation and kills off pancreatic cells. Watson thinks the root of that inflammation is different: "a lack of biological oxidants, not an excess", and discusses this in detail. One critical response was that the idea was neither new nor worthy of merit, and that The Lancet published Watson's paper only because of his name. Other scientists have expressed their support for his hypothesis and have proposed that it can also be expanded to why a lack of oxidants can result in cancer and its progression.

In 2014, Watson sold his Nobel prize medal to raise money after complaining of being made an "unperson" following controversial statements he had made. Part of the funds raised by the sale went to support scientific research. Watson intended to contribute the proceeds to conservation work in Long Island and to funding research at Trinity College, Dublin. He was the first living Nobel recipient to auction a medal. The medal was later returned to Watson by the purchaser, Alisher Usmanov.

Notable former students
Several of Watson's former doctoral students subsequently became notable in their own right including, Mario Capecchi, Bob Horvitz, Peter B. Moore and Joan Steitz. Besides numerous PhD students, Watson also supervised postdoctoral students and other interns including Ewan Birney, Ronald W. Davis, Phillip Allen Sharp (postdoc), John Tooze (postdoc) and Richard J. Roberts (postdoc).

Other affiliations
Watson is a former member of the Board of Directors of United Biomedical, Inc., founded by Chang Yi Wang. He held the position for six years and retired from the board in 1999.

In January 2007, Watson accepted the invitation of Leonor Beleza, president of the Champalimaud Foundation, to become the head of the foundation's scientific council, an advisory organ.

In March 2017, Watson was named head consultant of the Cheerland Investment Group, a Chinese investment company which sponsored his trip.

Watson has also been an institute adviser for the Allen Institute for Brain Science.

Avoid Boring People

Watson has had disagreements with Craig Venter regarding his use of EST fragments while Venter worked at NIH. Venter went on to found Celera genomics and continued his feud with Watson. Watson was quoted as calling Venter "Hitler".

In his memoir, Avoid Boring People: Lessons from a Life in Science, Watson describes his academic colleagues as "dinosaurs", "deadbeats", "fossils", "has-beens", "mediocre", and "vapid". Steve Shapin in Harvard Magazine noted that Watson had written an unlikely "Book of Manners", telling about the skills needed at different times in a scientist's career; he wrote Watson was known for aggressively pursuing his own goals at the university. E. O. Wilson once described Watson as "the most unpleasant human being I had ever met", but in a later TV interview said that he considered them friends and their rivalry at Harvard "old history" (when they had competed for funding in their respective fields).

In the epilogue to the memoir Avoid Boring People, Watson alternately attacks and defends former Harvard University president Lawrence Summers, who stepped down in 2006 due in part to his remarks about women and science. Watson also states in the epilogue, "Anyone sincerely interested in understanding the imbalance in the representation of men and women in science must reasonably be prepared at least to consider the extent to which nature may figure, even with the clear evidence that nurture is strongly implicated."

Comments on race 
At a conference in 2000, Watson suggested a link between skin color and sex drive, hypothesizing that dark-skinned people have stronger libidos. His lecture argued that extracts of melanin—which gives skin its color—had been found to boost subjects' sex drive. "That's why you have Latin lovers", he said, according to people who attended the lecture. "You've never heard of an English lover. Only an English Patient." He has also said that stereotypes associated with racial and ethnic groups have a genetic basis: Jews being intelligent, Chinese being intelligent but not creative because of selection for conformity, and Indians being servile because of selection under caste endogamy. Regarding intelligence differences between blacks and whites, Watson has asserted that "all our social policies are based on the fact that their (blacks) intelligence is the same as ours (whites) – whereas all the testing says not really ... people who have to deal with black employees find this not true."

Watson has repeatedly asserted that differences in average measured IQ between blacks and whites are due to genetics. In early October 2007, he was interviewed by Charlotte Hunt-Grubbe at Cold Spring Harbor Laboratory (CSHL). He discussed his view that Africans are less intelligent than Westerners. Watson said his intention was to promote science, not racism, but some UK venues canceled his appearances, and he canceled the rest of his tour. An editorial in Nature said that his remarks were "beyond the pale" but expressed a wish that the tour had not been canceled so that Watson would have had to face his critics in person, encouraging scientific discussion on the matter. Because of the controversy, the board of trustees at Cold Spring Harbor Laboratory suspended Watson's administrative responsibilities. Watson issued an apology, then retired at the age of 79 from CSHL from what the lab called "nearly 40 years of distinguished service". Watson attributed his retirement to his age and to circumstances that he could never have anticipated or desired.

In 2008, Watson was appointed chancellor emeritus of CSHL but continued to advise and guide project work at the laboratory. In a BBC documentary that year, Watson said he did not see himself as a racist.

In January 2019, following the broadcast of a television documentary made the previous year in which he repeated his views about race and genetics, CSHL revoked honorary titles that it had awarded to Watson and cut all remaining ties with him. Watson did not respond to the developments.

Personal life
Watson is an atheist. In 2003, he was one of 22 Nobel Laureates who signed the Humanist Manifesto.

Marriage and family
Watson married Elizabeth Lewis in 1968. They have two sons, Rufus Robert Watson (b. 1970) and Duncan James Watson (b. 1972). Watson sometimes talks about his son Rufus, who has schizophrenia, seeking to encourage progress in the understanding and treatment of mental illness by determining how genetics contributes to it.

Awards and honors

Watson has won numerous awards, including:

 Albert Lasker Award for Basic Medical Research, 1960
 Benjamin Franklin Medal for Distinguished Achievement in the Sciences (2001)
 Copley Medal of the Royal Society, 1993
 CSHL Double Helix Medal Honoree, 2008
 Eli Lilly Award in Biological Chemistry, 1960
 EMBO Membership in 1985
 Gairdner Foundation International Award, 2002
 Honorary Member of Royal Irish Academy, 2005
 Honorary Fellow, the Hastings Center, an independent bioethics research institution
 Honorary Knight Commander of the Order of the British Empire (KBE), 2002
 Irish America Hall of Fame, inducted March 2011
 John J. Carty Award in molecular biology from the National Academy of Sciences
 Liberty Medal, 2000
 Lomonosov Gold Medal, 1994
 Lotos Club Medal of Merit, 2004
 National Medal of Science, 1997
 Nobel Prize in Physiology or Medicine, 1962
 Othmer Gold Medal (2005)
 Presidential Medal of Freedom, 1977
 Golden Plate Award of the American Academy of Achievement, 1986

Honorary degrees received

 DSc, University of Chicago, US, 1961
 DSc, Indiana University, US, 1963
 LLD, University of Notre Dame, US, 1965
 DSc, Long Island University (CW Post), US, 1970
 DSc, Adelphi University, US, 1972
 DSc, Brandeis University, US, 1973
 DSc, Albert Einstein College of Medicine, US, 1974
 DSc, Hofstra University, US, 1976
 DSc, Harvard University, US, 1978
 DSc, Rockefeller University, US, 1980
 DSc, Clarkson College of Technology, US, 1981
 DSc, SUNY at Farmingdale, US, 1983
 MD, Buenos Aires, Argentina, 1986
 DSc, Rutgers University, US, 1988
 DSc, Bard College, US, 1991
 DSc, University of Stellenbosch, South Africa, 1993
 DSc, Fairfield University, US, 1993
 DSc, University of Cambridge, United Kingdom, 1993
 DrHC, Charles University in Prague, Czech Republic, 1998
 ScD, University of Dublin, Ireland, 2001

Professional and honorary affiliations

See also
 Behavioral genetics
 History of molecular biology
 History of RNA biology
 Life Story – 1987 BBC docudrama about Watson and Crick's discovery of DNA structure
 List of RNA biologists
 Predictive medicine
 Whole genome sequencing

References

Further reading
 Chadarevian, S. (2002) Designs For Life: Molecular Biology After World War II. Cambridge University Press .
 Chargaff, E. (1978) Heraclitean Fire. New York: Rockefeller Press.
 Chomet, S., ed., (1994) D.N.A.: Genesis of a Discovery London: Newman-Hemisphere Press.
 Collins, Francis. (2004) Coming to Peace With Science: Bridging the Worlds Between Faith and Biology. InterVarsity Press. .
 Collins, Francis. (2007) The Language of God: A Scientist Presents Evidence for Belief Free Press. .
 Crick, F. H. C. (1988) What Mad Pursuit: A Personal View of Scientific Discovery (Basic Books reprint edition, 1990) .
 John Finch; 'A Nobel Fellow On Every Floor', Medical Research Council 2008, 381 pp, ; this book is all about the MRC Laboratory of Molecular Biology, Cambridge.
 Friedberg, E.C.; "Sydney Brenner: A Biography", CSHL Press October 2010, .
 Friedburg, E. C. (2005) "The Writing Life of James D. Watson". "Cold Spring Harbor Laboratory Press" .
 Hunter, G. (2004) Light Is A Messenger: the life and science of William Lawrence Bragg. Oxford University Press. .
 Inglis, J., Sambrook, J. & Witkowski, J. A. (eds.) Inspiring Science: Jim Watson and the Age of DNA. Cold Spring Harbor Laboratory Press. 2003. .
 Judson, H. F. (1996). The Eighth Day of Creation: Makers of the Revolution in Biology, Expanded edition. Cold Spring Harbor Laboratory Press. .
 Maddox, B. (2003). Rosalind Franklin: The Dark Lady of DNA. Harper Perennial. .
 McEleheny, Victor K. (2003) Watson and DNA: Making a scientific revolution, Perseus. .
 Robert Olby; 1974 The Path to The Double Helix: Discovery of DNA. London: MacMillan. ; Definitive DNA textbook, with foreword by Francis Crick, revised in 1994 with a 9-page postscript.
 Robert Olby; (2003) "Quiet debut for the double helix" Nature 421 (January 23): 402–405.
 Robert Olby; "Francis Crick: Hunter of Life's Secrets", Cold Spring Harbor Laboratory Press, August 2009.
 Ridley, M. (2006) Francis Crick: Discoverer of the Genetic Code (Eminent Lives) New York: HarperCollins. .
 Anne Sayre, "Rosalind Franklin and DNA", New York/London: W.W. Norton and Company, 1975/2000.
 James D. Watson, "The Annotated and Illustrated Double Helix, edited by Alexander Gann and Jan Witkowski" (2012) Simon & Schuster, .
 Wilkins, M. (2003) The Third Man of the Double Helix: The Autobiography of Maurice Wilkins. Oxford: Oxford University Press. .
 The History of the University of Cambridge: Volume 4 (1870 to 1990), Cambridge University Press, 1992.

Selected books published

 James D. Watson, The Annotated and Illustrated Double Helix, edited by Alexander Gann and Jan Witkowski (2012) Simon & Schuster, .
 
  (Norton Critical Editions, 1981).

External links

 James D. Watson Collection at the Cold Spring Harbor Laboratory Library
 DNA – The Double Helix Game from Nobelprize.org
 MSN Encarta biography (Archived 2009-10-31)
 DNA Interactive – This site from the Dolan DNA Learning Center (part of CSHL) commemorates the discovery of the structure of DNA and includes dozens of animations, as well as interviews with James Watson and others.
 DNA from the Beginning – another DNA Learning Center site on the basics of DNA, genes, and heredity, from Mendel to the Human Genome Project.
 
 
 
 
 
 
 A Revolution at 50, February 25, 2003
 

Articles and interviews
 BBC Four Interviews  – Watson and Crick speaking on the BBC in 1962, 1972, and 1974.
 NPR Science Friday: "A Conversation with Genetics Pioneer James Watson" – Ira Flatow interviews Watson on the history of DNA and his recent book A Passion for DNA: Genes, Genomes, and Society. 2002-06-02
 NPR Science Friday "DNA: The Secret of Life" – Ira Flatow interviews Watson on his new book. 2003-05-02
 Discover "Reversing Bad Truths" – David Duncan interviews Watson. 2003-07-01
 Two remembrances of James Watson by one of the founders of molecular genetics, Esther Lederberg, can be found at http://www.estherlederberg.com/Anecdotes.html#WATSON1 and http://www.estherlederberg.com/Anecdotes.html#WATSON2
 James Watson telling his life story at Web of Stories
 American Masters: Decoding Watson PBS film about Watson, including extensive interviews with him, his family, and colleagues. 2019-01-02.
 James D. Watson, Ph.D. Biography and Interview on American Academy of Achievement

 
1928 births
Living people
20th-century American physicists
20th-century American zoologists
21st-century American physicists
21st-century American zoologists
American atheists
American biophysicists
American former Christians
American geneticists
American people of English descent
American people of Irish descent
American people of Scottish descent
American male non-fiction writers
American science writers
American textbook writers
Fellows of Clare College, Cambridge
Foreign Members of the Royal Society
Foreign Members of the Russian Academy of Sciences
Foreign Members of the USSR Academy of Sciences
Former Roman Catholics
Harvard University faculty
Hastings Center Fellows
Honorary Knights Commander of the Order of the British Empire
Indiana University alumni
Members of the European Molecular Biology Organization
Members of the Royal Irish Academy
Members of the United States National Academy of Sciences
American molecular biologists
National Medal of Science laureates
Nobel laureates in Physiology or Medicine
People from Cold Spring Harbor, New York
Presidential Medal of Freedom recipients
Phage workers
Race and intelligence controversy
Recipients of the Albert Lasker Award for Basic Medical Research
Recipients of the Copley Medal
Scientists from Chicago
Scientists from New York (state)
Proponents of scientific racism
University of Chicago alumni
Writers from Chicago
Writers from New York (state)
American expatriates in the United Kingdom